
Gmina Milejów is a rural gmina (administrative district) in Łęczna County, Lublin Voivodeship, in eastern Poland.

Villages
Gmina Milejów contains the villages and settlements of Antoniów, Antoniów-Kolonia, Białka, Białka-Kolonia, Cyganka, Dąbrowa, Górne, Jaszczów, Jaszczów-Kolonia, Kajetanówka, Klarów, Łańcuchów, Łysołaje, Łysołaje-Kolonia, Maryniów, Milejów, Milejów-Osada, Ostrówek-Kolonia, Popławy, Starościce, Wólka Bielecka, Wólka Łańcuchowska, Zalesie and Zgniła Struga.

Neighbouring gminas
Gmina Milejów is bordered by the gminas of Łęczna, Mełgiew, Piaski, Puchaczów, Siedliszcze and Trawniki.

References

Polish official population figures 2006

Milejow
Łęczna County